Ioannis "Yianis" Vilaras (1771–1823) was a Greek doctor, lyricist and writer who often discussed linguistic matters (see Greek language question) and maintained ties with many figures of the Modern Greek Enlightenment movement. 

His name is also related to an original Albanian Vellara alphabet, until now only discovered in a few pages that Vilaras wrote in the Albanian language. Vilaras is remembered primarily as a modern Greek poet, non-native Albanian speaker but fluent, according to François Pouqueville, who also describes him as bright.

Biography

Vilaras was born on the island of Kythira, then part of the Venetian Republic, and studied medicine in Padova, Italy. He later moved to Ioannina, his father's home city, where he was connected with Ali Pasha and became friends with Athanasios Psalidas. Vilaras's father was also a doctor in the area. 

After the fall of Ioannina to the Turks, he fled to Tsepelovo in Zagori, where he died three years later, in 1823.

Work
Vilaras was one of the first modern Greek poets and important figures of modern Greek literature. He favoured an extreme/radical version of Demotic Greek (people's language), based mainly on the phonetic orthography, without using historic orthography or tones. 

His most famous work is the Romeiki glosa (Ρομεηκη γλοσα [sic]), written in Corfu in 1814, which was different from the mainstream ways of Greek writing.

His other works include Amartia and Gnothi Safton. In 1953, "Apanta of Vilaras" ("Complete Works of Vilaras") was published, including erotic and lyric poems, myths, and enigmas.

Works

Poetry

Prose

See also
 Vellara alphabet

References

External links

 
 Vilaras Albanian manuscript (p. 219–23) at Bibliothèque nationale de France

1771 births
1823 deaths
People from Kythira
Ottoman Ioannina
Greek writers
18th-century Greek writers
Modern Greek poets
18th-century poets from the Ottoman Empire
Greeks from the Ottoman Empire
18th-century writers from the Ottoman Empire
18th-century Greek poets
Greek male poets
People of the Modern Greek Enlightenment
Modern Greek language
Male poets from the Ottoman Empire
18th-century male writers